Notable Slovak football transfers in the summer transfer window 2015 by club. Only transfers of the Fortuna Liga and DOXXbet liga are included.

Fortuna Liga

FK AS Trenčín

In:

Out:

MŠK Žilina

In:

Out:

ŠK Slovan Bratislava

In:

Out:

FC Spartak Trnava

In:

Out:

FK Senica

In:

Out:

MFK Ružomberok

In:

Out:

FC DAC 1904 Dunajská Streda

In:

Out:

Spartak Myjava

In:

Out:

FC ViOn Zlaté Moravce

In:

Out:

FO ŽP Šport Podbrezová

In:

Out:

MFK Zemplín Michalovce

In:

Out:

MFK Skalica

In:

Out:

DOXXbet liga

FK Dukla Banská Bystrica

In:

Out:

FC Nitra

In:

Out:

ŠKF Sereď

In:

Out:

FK Slovan Duslo Šaľa

In:

Out:

TJ Iskra Borčice

In:

Out:

FC VSS Košice

In:

}
}
}
}

Out:

1. FC Tatran Prešov

In:

Out:

MFK Tatran Liptovský Mikuláš

In:

Out:

Partizán Bardejov

In:

Out:

MFK Lokomotíva Zvolen

In:

Out:

FK Poprad

In:

Out:

FC Lokomotíva Košice

In:

Out:

OFK Teplička nad Váhom

In:

Out:

References

Slovak
Transfers
2015